Mossflower is a fantasy novel by Brian Jacques, published in 1988. It is the second book published and third chronologically in the Redwall series.

Plot summary 

The story begins in the Mossflower Wood, where a community of animals suffers under the tyranny of a ruling wildcat named Verdauga Greeneyes. When a mouse from the north by the name of Martin the Warrior travels to Mossflower Woods, he is captured and brought to the castle Kotir. While there, his sword is broken by Verdauga's daughter, Tsarmina, and he is imprisoned within the Kotir dungeons. Meanwhile, Tsarmina poisons Verdauga with the help of the vixen Fortunata and blames it on her brother Gingivere. She places her brother in prison and takes the throne for herself.

While in the dungeons, Martin eventually meets Gonff the Mousethief, who was imprisoned for stealing food from the Kotir storages. Meanwhile, Abbess Germaine and the surviving members of Loamhedge, an abbey stricken with a plague, arrive and join the woodlanders. Martin and Gonff escape with help from the Corim (Council Of Resistance In Mossflower) and join with Young Dinny the mole on a quest to find Boar the Fighter, Badger Lord of Salamandastron. Bella, a Corim leader and Boar's daughter, believed only her father could defeat Tsarmina and put an end to her cruel reign.

The crew sets out on the quest to find Boar. They are pursued by Splitnose the stoat, Blacktooth the ferret, and their leader, Scratch the weasel. The trio eventually dies- Scratch by a swan, and Splitnose and Blacktooth in a duel. The crew eventually comes to a river with a ferry, where they meet a snake and a newt who threaten to kill the travellers. A shrew emerges and scares away the duo into the river, and introduces himself as Log-a-log Big Club, a former village leader, escaped oar slave, and currently a ferryman. He joins the group on its quest. They sail on his boat, Waterwing to the mountains. The ship is broken in a waterfall. When Martin comes to, he is in a huge mountain ruled by bats, called Bat Mountpit. After Martin, Dinny and Log-a-log help scare away the tawny owl that nests on the rooftop, they leave. They get ambushed by toads, and get thrown into the "Screamhole", where they reunite with Gonff. They meet the Snakefish, the massive eel who is trapped in the hole, and formulate a plan to escape. They eventually escape with the help of the Snakefish, who wreaks havoc among the toads. The group reaches the beach. They trek through the sand, attacked by birds. Deprived from food and water, they witness gulls kill a rat. They stay at the rat's hut, and continue the next day, with Salamandastron very near. The companions reach Salamandastron with the help of a few hares, and meet with Boar the Fighter. Boar introduces them to the hares that live in the mountain, and then reforges Martin's broken sword with metal from a meteorite, but is killed while fighting his mortal enemy Ripfang the searat who had attacked Salamandastron several times before. Ripfang's former oarslaves and several members of Log a Log's former tribe take over the sea rat ship, Bloodwake, with help from Martin and his allies. They return to Mossflower Woods, where Martin kills Tsarmina and destroys Kotir by both flooding it and knocking over its walls with a ballista. In the final battle with Tsarmina, Martin is left near death. With the help of the woodlanders, he eventually recovers, but his memory is never the same thereafter, as evidenced in The Legend of Luke.

The book ends with Bella's son, Sunflash, finding Salamandastron and becoming its ruler.

Characters in Mossflower

Martin the Warrior
Gonff the Mousethief
Tsarmina Greeneyes
Bella of Brockhall
Gingivere
Young Dinny
Brogg
Old Dinny
Abbess Germaine
Boar the Fighter
Skipper the Otter
Lady Amber
Captain Cludd
Fortunata
Verdauga Greeneyes
Sunflash the Mace
Splitnose
Blacktooth
Thicktail
Ratflank
Lord Cayvear
Marshgreen
Scratch the Weasel
Mask
Deathcoil
Whipscale
Scragg
Squint
Snakefish

Reception
Publishers Weekly described the book as "rousingly old-fashioned", and stated that fans of Redwall would enjoy it. Kirkus Reviews praised Jacques' ability to skillfully switch between multiple plot strands and characters without confusion, as well as his well-individualized characters. However, they also commented on the simplicity of the book's philosophy.

Translations
(Dutch) Het Moswoud
Het Moswoud: De Koningin van Duizend Ogen
Het Moswoud: De Weg Naar de Vuurberg
Het Moswoud: De Afrekening
(Finnish) Sammalkukkametsän Sota
(French) Rougemuraille : Martin le guerrier
La Reine aux yeux multiples
La Montagne de feu
Le Retour triomphal.
(German)
In den Fängen der Wildkatze
Mossflower
Kotir: die Burg des Schreckens
(Italian) Fior Muschiato
(Norwegian) Moseblom
(Swedish) Mossblomma
(Russian) Котир: Война с Дикой Кошкой
(Spanish) Mossflower
(Latvian) Ķērpjziedu zeme - Leģenda par Mārtinu Karotāju
Ķērpjziedu zeme: Kotīra
Ķērpjziedu zeme: Salamandastrona
Ķērpjziedu zeme: Ūdenskauja

Publication history
1988, UK, Hutchinson , Hardback, il. by Gary Chalk
1988, US, Philomel , Hardback, il. by Gary Chalk
2004, US, Philomel , Hardback (green leatherette), il. by David Elliot

References

External links

 Plot summary

Fictional mice and rats
Children's fantasy novels
British children's novels
British fantasy novels
Redwall books
1988 fantasy novels
1988 British novels
Hutchinson (publisher) books
1988 children's books